Marta Gran Rodríguez (born on 25 November 1968 in Barcelona) is a Spanish rugby player. She plays in the second line position. She received the bronze medal of the Spanish Rugby Federation in 2001.
Rodríguez made her debut with Club Esportiu INEF Barcelona, with which she won two Spanish Championships (1989, 1995). In the 1994-95, season he signed for Rugby Club l'Hospitalet, winning three Queen Cups (1997, 1998, 2002). In the 2002-03 season he played at BUC, where she ended up retiring. 

Rodríguez played for the Spain women's national rugby union team on thirty-seven occasions. She was 1995 European champion. She participated in the 1998 Women's Rugby World Cup and 2002 Women's Rugby World Cup.

References 

1968 births
Living people
Spanish rugby union players